Enrique Martínez Dizido (1789-1870) was an Uruguayan politician and military man, who served during the Wars of Independence under General José de San Martín and Juan Gregorio de las Heras. He also took part in the war against Brazil and in the Civil Wars of Argentina.

He was born in Montevideo, Uruguay, the son of José Gaspar Martínez Fontes y Bustamante and María de los Ángeles Dizido y Zamudio, belonging to a distinguished family.

References 

1789 births
1870 deaths
Argentine Army officers
Argentine generals
People from Buenos Aires
People from Montevideo
People from Lima